The 2012 K League, officially known as Hyundai Oilbank K-League 2012, was the 30th season of the K League. It was sponsored by Hyundai Oilbank. Since this season, the K League Championship and the Korean League Cup were abolished, and K League introduced the "split system", inspired by Scottish Premier League. After all 16 clubs played 30 matches each under the home and away system, they were split into the group of top eight and the group of bottom eight, playing with each other in a group again.

Teams

General information

Personnel and kits

Managerial changes

Foreign players
Restricting the number of foreign players strictly to four per team, including a slot for a player from AFC countries. A team could use four foreign players on the field each game including a least one player from the AFC country.

League table

Positions by matchday

Round 1–30

Round 31–44

Results

Matches 1–30

Matches 31–44

Top eight

Bottom eight

Player statistics

Top scorers

Top assist providers

Awards

Main awards

Source:

Best XI

Source:

Attendance
Due to the match-fixing scandal that involved 40 current and former players in the previous year, there was a massive decline on the attendance in this season. The scandal still affect on the league's attendance for several seasons onwards.

Attendance by club

Top matches

See also
2012 in South Korean football
2012 Korean FA Cup
List of South Korean football transfers winter 2011–12

References

External links
Official website 
Review at K League 

K League seasons
1
South Korea
South Korea